Virgil W. Bingman (July 22, 1907 – February 3, 1990) was an American football and basketball player and coach. He served as the head football coach at Defiance College in Defiance, Ohio from 1941 to 1942, compiling a record of 4–6.

Wingman played college basketball at Southern Illinois University Carbondale under head coach William McAndrew.

References

External links
 

1907 births
1990 deaths
Defiance Yellow Jackets football coaches
Southern Illinois Salukis men's basketball players
American men's basketball players